Ambulyx suluensis is a species of moth of the  family Sphingidae. It is known from the Philippines.

References

Ambulyx
Moths described in 1998
Moths of Asia